Noel John Price (27 December 1917 – 17 July 1984) was an Australian rules footballer who played with Fitzroy in the Victorian Football League (VFL).

Family
The fourth and youngest child of Joseph Allister Price (1886-1985), and Ellen May Price (1886-1973), née Horrocks, Noel John Price was born at Yarragon, Victoria on 27 December 1917.

He married Jean Caldwell Yemm (1913-2000) in 1942.

Football
Recruited from Warragul, he wore the number 22 and was a half forward flanker.

Military service
Price's Fitzroy career was interrupted by his service in the Royal Australian Air Force during World War II.

Notes

References
 [https://nominal-rolls.dva.gov.au/veteran?id=958772&c=WW2 World War Two Nominal Roll: Leading Aircraftman Noel John Price (118902), Department of Veterans' Affairs.]
 A9301, 118902: World War Two Service Record: Leading Aircraftman Noel John Price (118902), National Archives of Australia''.

External links
 
 2004 obituary of Maurie Hearn, mentioning Clen Denning and Laurie Bickerton as the surviving members of the Maroons' 1944 side

1917 births
Australian rules footballers from Victoria (Australia)
Fitzroy Football Club players
Fitzroy Football Club Premiership players
Warragul Football Club players
1984 deaths
One-time VFL/AFL Premiership players
Royal Australian Air Force personnel of World War II
Military personnel from Victoria (Australia)